Trevor Misipeka (born 17 June 1979 in Pago Pago) is an American football player and athlete from American Samoa. He played for the now defunct Quad City Steamwheelers in the Arena Football League's af2 league.

Biography
Misipeka is known for his performance in the 100 metres in the 2001 World Athletics Championships, held in Edmonton, Alberta, Canada. He represented American Samoa and had originally intended to compete in the shot put, but the Samoan federation discovered that the IAAF's policy of allowing competitors from small countries to enter without meeting qualifying standards had recently been changed, and now applied only to track events and not field ones.

Having already arrived at the championships, he was told by the Samoan federation with just two days notice that he was instead being entered for the 100 metres. It was one of the slowest times ever seen in the World Championships. He was nicknamed "Trevor the Tortoise" in a similar vein to other popular sporting heroes such as Eddie "The Eagle" Edwards and Eric "The Eel" Moussambani.

After the championships he completed a business degree at California Baptist University and then turned to arena football, playing for the San Diego Riptide from 2002 until 2005 and then the Quad City Steamwheelers. After the AF2's demise, he became a baker.

References

1979 births
Living people
American sportspeople of Samoan descent
American football defensive linemen
American football offensive linemen
California Baptist University alumni
Quad City Steamwheelers players
American Samoan male shot putters
Sportspeople from Temecula, California
Arizona Rattlers players
Players of American football from California
World Athletics Championships athletes for American Samoa
Players of American football from American Samoa
American sportsmen
American Samoan male sprinters
People from Pago Pago